Bentley Systems, Incorporated is an American-based software development company that develops, manufactures, licenses, sells and supports computer software and services for the design, construction, and operation of infrastructure. The company's software serves the building, plant, civil, and geospatial markets in the areas of architecture, engineering, construction (AEC) and operations. Their software products are used to design, engineer, build, and operate large constructed assets such as roadways, railways, bridges, buildings, industrial plants, power plants, and utility networks. The company re-invests 20% of their revenues in research and development.

Bentley Systems is headquartered in Exton, Pennsylvania, United States, but has development, sales and other departments in over 50 countries. In 2021, the company generated revenue of $1 billion in 186 countries.

Software

Bentley has three principal software product lines: MicroStation, ProjectWise, and AssetWise. Since 2014, some products have been based on the Microsoft Azure cloud computing platform.

History

Keith A. Bentley and Barry J. Bentley founded Bentley Systems in 1984. They introduced the commercial version of PseudoStation in 1985, which allowed users of Intergraph's VAX systems to use low-cost graphics terminals to view and modify the designs on their Intergraph IGDS (Interactive Graphics Design System) installations. Their first product was shown to potential users who were polled as to what they would be willing to pay for it. They averaged the answers, arriving at a price of $7,943. A DOS-based version of MicroStation was introduced in 1986.

Acquisitions
On June 18, 1997, Bentley acquired IdeaGraphix, a developer of MicroStation-based application software for architecture, engineering, and facilities management.
On January 15, 1998, Bentley acquired Jacobus.
On January 2, 2001, Bentley acquired Intergraph's civil engineering, plot-services and raster conversion software businesses.
On October 17, 2001, Bentley Systems bought Geopak design software for road and rail infrastructure.
On July 30, 2002, Bentley Systems acquired Rebis.
On January 6, 2003, Bentley announced it would acquire Infrasoft Corporation.
On August 2, 2004, Bentley acquired Haestad Methods, Inc.
On August 31, 2005, Bentley agreed to acquire netGuru's Research Engineers International (REI) business which included its  STAAD structural analysis and design product line.
On June 6, 2006, Bentley acquired GEF-RIS AG.
On January 29, 2007, Bentley acquired KIWI Software.
On  May 12, 2007, Bentley acquired C.W. Beilfuss and Associates.
On May 9, 2007, Bentley acquired TDV GmbH, an analysis and design software provider for bridge engineering.
On January 22, 2008, Bentley acquired Hevacomp, Ltd.
On January 24, 2008, Bentley acquired LEAP Software, Inc.
On January 29, 2008, Bentley acquired promis•e product line from ECT International.
On May 28, 2008, Bentley Systems acquired Common Point for mainstream construction simulation.
On October 13, 2009, Bentley added geotechnical and geoenvironmental capabilities with the acquisition of  Software.
On February 9, 2010, Bentley Systems announced two acquisitions: Exor Corporation and Enterprise Informatics.
On March 2, 2011, Bentley Systems acquired SACS™ software for offshore structural analysis from Engineering Dynamics, Inc.
On December 10, 2011, Bentley acquired FormSys.
On November 8, 2011, Bentley acquired Pointools Ltd., a British developer of point-cloud software technology.
On March 7, 2012, Bentley acquired the  software business of Hannappel Software.
On May 18, 2012, Bentley acquired InspectTech Systems, USA, a provider of field inspection applications and asset management services for bridges and other transportation assets.
On September 19, 2012, Bentley acquired Canadian-based Ivara.
On November 12, 2012, Bentley acquired the Microprotol pressure vessel design and analysis software from EuResearch.
On November 13, 2012, Bentley acquired SpecWave.
On March 14, 2013, Bentley acquired topoGRAPH, a provider of surveying software.
On October 8, 2013, Bentley acquired the MOSES software business from Ultramarine.
On February 25, 2014, Bentley acquired DocQnet Systems’ eB Services BizDocQnet Systems.
On September 26, 2014, Bentley acquired SITEOPS, optimization software for enhanced land development site design, from Blueridge Analytics.
On January 14, 2015, Bentley acquired C3global for predictive modeling.
On February 10, 2015, Bentley acquired Acute3D.
On February 15, 2015, Bentley acquired reality modeling creator e-on.
On January 23, 2018, Bentley acquired S-Cube Futuretech Pvt Ltd. to expand its offerings specific to the concrete engineering design and documentation software users in India, Southeast Asia, and the Middle East.
On April 26, 2018, Bentley acquired Dutch geotechnical modelling company Plaxis B.V.
On July 15, 2018, Bentley acquired Canadian geotechnical modeling company SOILVISION Systems Ltd. in order to enhance its 3D geotechnical offerings.
On June 20, 2018, Bentley acquired Synchro. 
On October 15, 2018, Bentley acquired Agency9.
On October 15, 2018, Bentley acquired LEGION.
On November 12, 2018, Bentley acquired ACE enterprise Slovakia.
On November 13, 2018, Bentley acquired Alworx.
On February 11, 2019, Bentley acquired SignCAD Systems.
On May 13, 2019, Bentley acquired Keynetix.
On October 22, 2019, Bentley acquired Citilabs, Inc. & Orbit GeoSpatial Technologies.
On October 18, 2020, Bentley acquired UK based consultancy Professional Construction Strategies Group (PCSG).
On December 1, 2020, Bentley acquired SRO Solutions.
On March 23, 2021, Bentley acquired Ontracks Consulting.
On April 14, 2021, Bentley acquired INRO Software.
On June 14, 2021, Bentley acquired SPIDA Software.
On June 17, 2021, Bentley acquired Seequent Holdings Limited.
On January 31, 2022, Bentley acquired Power Line Systems.
On April 7, 2022, Bentley acquired ADINA R&D, Inc.
On August 9, 2022, Bentley acquired Eagle.io

In April 2002, Bentley filed for an initial public offering, but it was withdrawn before taking effect.
In November 2016, German-based Siemens announced it would pay about $76 million for a minority stake in Bentley, as well as invest in developing joint software with it.

In September 2020, Bentley Systems sets terms of its IPO valuing the company at about $4.96 billion. The company would offer 10.75 million shares priced between $17 and $19 per share.

Bentley Institute Press

Bentley Systems also is a publisher of textbooks and professional references for the architectural, engineering, and construction (AEC), operations, geospatial, and educational communities, under the name Bentley Institute Press.

Bentley Infrastructure 500

Since 2010, Bentley annually published a ranking of the top owners of infrastructure from both the public and private sectors.

References

External links
  

Software companies based in Pennsylvania
Software companies established in 1984
Privately held companies based in Pennsylvania
Building information modeling
Companies listed on the Nasdaq
Software companies of the United States